The SPAR Premium League (SPL) is the premier women's handball league in Switzerland, established in 1970. LC Brühl is the championship's most successful club by a large margin with 31 titles including two 11-years winning streaks, followed by ATV Basel-Stadt with four and TSV St. Otmar and Spono Nottwil with three.

Currently the league is contested by eight teams. The champion is granted a spot in the Champions League's qualifying tournament.

Current season

Teams for season 2020–21

DHB Rotweiss Thun
GC Amicitia Zürich
HSC Kreuzlingen
HV Herzogenbuchsee
LC Brühl Handball
LK Zug
SPONO EAGLES
Yellow Winterthur

List of champions

 1970 LC Brühl
 1971 LC Brühl (2)
 1972 LC Brühl (3)
 1973 LC Brühl (4)
 1974 LC Brühl (5)
 1975 LC Brühl (6)
 1976 LC Brühl (7)
 1977 LC Brühl (8)
 1978 LC Brühl (9)
 1979 LC Brühl (10)
 1980 LC Brühl (11)
 1981 RTV 1879 Basel
 1982 ATV Basel-Stadt
 1983 ATV Basel-Stadt (2) 
 1984 RTV 1879 Basel (3)
 1985 ATV Basel-Stadt (4)
 1986 ATV Basel-Stadt (5)
 1987 LC Brühl (12)

 1988 LC Brühl (13)
 1989 LC Brühl (14)
 1990 LC Brühl (15)
 1991 LC Brühl (16)
 1992 LC Brühl (17)
 1993 LC Brühl (18)
 1994 LC Brühl (19)
 1995 LC Brühl (20)
 1996 LC Brühl (21)
 1997 LC Brühl (22)
 1998 TSV St. Otmar 
 1999 TSV St. Otmar (2)
 2000 Spono Nottwil 
 2001 Spono Nottwil (2)
 2002 LC Brühl (23)
 2003 LC Brühl (24)
 2004 ZMC Amicitia Zürich
 2005 TSV St. Otmar (3)

 2006 Spono Nottwil (3)
 2007 LC Brühl (25)
 2008 LC Brühl (26)
 2009 LC Brühl (27)
 2010 LK Zug
 2011 LC Brühl (28)
 2012 LC Brühl (29)
 2013 LK Zug (2)
 2014 LK Zug (3)
 2015 LK Zug (4)
 2016 Spono Nottwil (4)
 2017 LC Brühl (30)
 2018 Spono Nottwil (5)
 2019 LC Brühl (31)
 2020 not awarded
 2021 LK Zug (5)
 2022 Spono Eagles (6)

See also
 SHV-Cup (Swiss women's national cup)
 Swiss Handball League (male counterpart)

References

Women's handball in Switzerland
Switzerland
1970 establishments in Switzerland
Sports leagues established in 1970
Women's sports leagues in Switzerland
Professional sports leagues in Switzerland